The 2019–20 Minnesota State Mavericks men's ice hockey season was the 51st season of play for the program, the 24th at the Division I level and the 21st in the WCHA conference. The Mavericks represented Minnesota State University, Mankato and were coached by Mike Hastings, in his 8th season.

The team's season ended abruptly when the WCHA announced that the remainder of the tournament was cancelled due to the COVID-19 pandemic in the United States on March 12, 2020.

Roster
As of July 12, 2019.

|}

Standings

Schedule and results

|-
!colspan=12 style=";" | Exhibition

|-
!colspan=12 style=";" | Regular Season

|-
!colspan=12 style=";" | 

|-
!colspan=12 style=";" | 

|- align="center" bgcolor="#e0e0e0"
|colspan=12|Minnesota State Won Series 2–0
|- align="center" bgcolor="#e0e0e0"
|colspan=12|Remainder of Tournament Cancelled

Scoring Statistics

Goaltending statistics

Rankings

References

Minnesota State Mavericks men's ice hockey seasons
Minnesota State Mavericks
Minnesota State Mavericks
Minnesota State Mavericks
Minnesota State Mavericks